A Word Is Also a Picture of a Word is 31Knots' third album. It was released on April 22, 2002. The title of the album is derived from a phrase written by Don DeLillo in his book Libra.

Track listing
 Preface – 0:41
 Tower of the Middle of the Month – 3:29
 E for Alpha – 4:56
 Buy High Sell Low – 2:39
 Breathe to Please Them – 5:14
 Flight of the Moron – 1:16
 Frozen Found Fire – 5:11
 Myopic Fights – 4:04
 Pity Has No Power – 3:51
 Era of Artillery – 6:30
 Surface Learning – 3:18

Credits
 31Knots – Main performer, Mixing 
 Adam Selzer – Mixing 
 Amy Annelle – Vocals 
 Jason Powers – Mixing 
 Kevin Nettleingham – Mastering 
 Pat Kenneally – Engineer, Mixing 
 Shane Deleon – Trumpet

References

31Knots albums
2002 debut albums